The 2011–12 Football League Cup (known as the Carling Cup for sponsorship reasons) was the 52nd season of the Football League Cup, a knock-out competition for the top 92 football clubs played in English football league system. Birmingham City were the defending champions, but were knocked out 2–0 by Manchester City in the Third Round.

Liverpool, the winner of the competition, qualified for the third qualifying round of the 2012–13 UEFA Europa League. The final was held on 26 February 2012, and was contested at Wembley Stadium between finalists Liverpool and Cardiff City. Cardiff were the first team outside the Premier League to appear in a League Cup final since 2001. It was Liverpool's first appearance at the new Wembley. Liverpool won the final 3–2 on penalties, claiming a record eighth League Cup, after the score was 2–2 after extra time.

Background

Broadcasting rights
The broadcasting rights for the 2011–12 Cup in the UK were shared between Sky Sports and the BBC. Sky Sports had rights to broadcast two live matches from each round while the BBC showed match highlights online and on a special League Cup highlights show which was broadcast in the late evening on BBC One.

The BBC showed two legs of the semi-final fixtures and Sky Sports showed the other two. Both BBC and Sky Sports simulcasted the final on 26 February 2012.

Preliminary round
Times up to and including the fourth round are BST (UTC+1). Times from the quarter-finals onwards are GMT (UTC±0).

Due to newly relegated (and League Cup title holders) Birmingham City having a bye to the third round following qualification to the Europa League and the extra Europa League berth awarded to Fulham through the Fair Play league, newly promoted AFC Wimbledon and Crawley Town played each other in a preliminary round. The draw for the round took place on 13 June with Crawley Town at home. This was the first need for a Preliminary Round since the 2002–03 season.

First round
The draw for the first round took place on 16 June 2011 at 10:00 BST. The First Round took place in the week commencing 8 August 2011. Rioting in London caused three matches to be postponed on the advice of the Metropolitan Police. The fixtures at West Ham United, Charlton Athletic and Crystal Palace were called off on safety grounds. The ties at Bristol City and Bristol Rovers were called off later after the disorder spread across England. The round was also notable, from a footballing perspective, for the first competitive Nottingham derby since 1994 between Nottingham Forest and rivals Notts County. The match ended 3–3, with Forest winning the subsequent penalty shoot-out 4–3.

Northern section

Southern section

Second round
The draw for the second round took place on 11 August 2011. The thirteen Premier League teams not involved in European competition entered the competition at this stage.

The second round took place in the week commencing 22 August 2011.

Third round
The draw for the third round took place on 27 August 2011. The eight English clubs who qualified for European competition in the 2010–11 season – Arsenal, Birmingham City, Chelsea, Fulham, Manchester City, Manchester United, Stoke City and Tottenham Hotspur – entered the competition at this stage. Only two teams from League Two remained at this stage: Aldershot Town and Shrewsbury Town.

The Third Round took place in the week commencing 19 September 2011.

Fourth round
The draw for the fourth round took place on 24 September 2011. Aldershot Town were the lowest ranked team remaining in the competition and the only team representing League Two at this stage. No teams from League One remained.

The Fourth Round took place in the week commencing 24 October 2011.

Fifth round
The draw for the fifth round took place on 29 October 2011. Cardiff City and Crystal Palace of the Championship were the only non-Premier League clubs left at this stage, which also saw last season's top four Premier League clubs competing.

The fifth round matches took place in the week commencing 28 November 2011.

Semi-finals
The draw for the semi-finals took place on 30 November 2011. Unlike the rest of the tournament, the semi-finals are played over two legs, with the aggregate score after the second leg determining the winners. In the event of the aggregate scores being level after the second legs, 30 minutes of extra time will be played, with the away goals rule applied.

The first legs took place in the week commencing 9 January 2012, with the second legs a fortnight later in the week commencing 23 January 2012.

First leg

Second leg

Cardiff City won 3–1 on penalties.

Liverpool won 3–2 on aggregate

Final

The final was played on 26 February 2012 at Wembley Stadium. The final involved one team from the Premier League, Liverpool, and one from the Championship, Cardiff City. The game was won by Liverpool after a penalty shoot-out.

Top scorers

References

2011-12
2011–12 domestic association football cups
Lea
Cup